Paeonia parnassica, the Greek peony, is a plant that is native to the mountains of south-central Greece.  The flowers are produced in late spring with a deep maroon red colouring on 65 cm stems.  The blooms are large, up to 12 cm in diameter and bear a boss of rich orange stamens. This peony was once included with the species P. mascula.

Genetics
The Greek peony is an autotetraploid (4n=20) of which the diploid parent must have gone extinct.

References

parnassica
Endemic flora of Greece